The term Big Bend of the Columbia River has two different usages:

In Canada, it refers to the northward arc of the Columbia River through a region hence known as the Big Bend Country
in the United States, it refers to the wide curve in the Columbia River's course as it bends south then southeast in the area of Wenatchee, Washington

See also
Big Bend (disambiguation)

Columbia River